Dalbergia hancei is a species of liana, with the Vietnamese name (dây) trắc Hance.  The genus Dalbergia is placed in the subfamily Faboideae and tribe Dalbergieae; no subspecies are listed in the Catalogue of Life.

References

External links

 
Flora of Indo-China